Talone Ordell (1880–1948), better known as Tal Ordel, was an Australian actor, writer and director. Ordell was probably born in Calcutta, India, seventh child of Victorian-born parents William Odell Raymond Buntine, drover, and his wife Susanna, née Mawley. He worked extensively on stage and screen as an actor in the 1910s and 1920s, playing Dad Rudd twice for Raymond Longford and Dad Hayseed – a similar role – three times for Beaumont Smith. He was the original "Ginger Mick" in the stage version of The Sentimental Bloke. He toured Australia with Marie Tempest.

He turned director with The Kid Stakes (1927), based on the cartoon character Fatty Finn. In the 1930s he worked more in radio as a writer and actor.

Select filmography
The Hayseeds' Back-blocks Show (1917)
The Hayseeds Come to Sydney (1917)
The Hayseeds' Melbourne Cup (1918)
On Our Selection (1920)
The Man from Snowy River (1920)
Silks and Saddles (1920) – actor
Cows and Cuddles (1921) (short) – director
The Gentleman Bushranger (1921) – actor
Rudd's New Selection (1921) – actor
While the Billy Boils (1921) – actor
The Kid Stakes (1927) – actor, writer, producer, director
The Sentimental Bloke (1932) – actor
The Hayseeds (1933) – actor
Harvest Gold (1945) – actor

Select theatre credits
On Our Selection – actor
The Sentimental Bloke – actor
Kangaroo Flat (1926) – author

References

External links
 
Tal Ordell at Australian Dictionary of Biography
Tal Ordell at AusStage
Tal Ordell at National Film and Sound Archive

1880 births
1948 deaths
Australian male stage actors
20th-century Australian male actors
Australian male radio actors
Australian film directors
Australian male silent film actors
British people in colonial India
British emigrants to Australia